Terry Park (born 7 February 1957) is a footballer who played as a midfielder in the Football League for Stockport County, Manchester City and Bury. He also played in the United States for the Fort Lauderdale Strikers and the Minnesota Kicks before going on to work in the NAM RCC team.

References

1957 births
Living people
Footballers from Liverpool
English footballers
Association football midfielders
Wolverhampton Wanderers F.C. players
Stockport County F.C. players
Fort Lauderdale Strikers (1977–1983) players
Minnesota Kicks players
Manchester City F.C. players
Bury F.C. players
Barrow A.F.C. players
English Football League players
English expatriate footballers
Expatriate soccer players in the United States
North American Soccer League (1968–1984) players
English expatriate sportspeople in the United States